Pheasant Run is an unincorporated community and census-designated place in Lorain County, Ohio, United States. Its population was 1,397 as of the 2010 census.

Geography

Demographics

References

Unincorporated communities in Lorain County, Ohio
Unincorporated communities in Ohio
Census-designated places in Lorain County, Ohio
Census-designated places in Ohio